The Middle Texas League was a six–team Class D level minor league baseball league that played in the 1914 and 1915 seasons. The Middle Texas League featured franchises based in Texas. The Middle Texas League permanently folded during the 1915 season. Baseball Hall of Fame member Kid Nichols managed the 1914 Temple Tigers and Hall of Famer Ross Youngs played for the 1915 Bartlett Bearcats.

History
The Middle Texas League began to play in the 1914 season as a new Class D level minor league. The president of the league was W.F. Blum, Jr. The Middle Texas League began play as a six–team league, hosting franchises from Bartlett, Texas (Bartlett Bearcats), Belton, Texas (Belton Braves), Brenham, Texas (Brenham Brewers), Georgetown, Texas (Georgetown Collegians), Lampasas, Texas (Lampasas Resorters) and Temple, Texas (Temple Tigers).

The Middle Texas League began play on May 8, 1914. The league played a spit–season schedule. In 1914, the Temple Tigers won the first–half standings and the Belton Braves won the second–half standings. The final overall standings featured the Bartlett Bearcats (22–59), Belton Braves (37–47), Brenham Brewers (50–34), Georgetown Collegians (50–30), Lampasas Resorters (35–51) and Temple Tigers (54–27). In the Championship playoff, the Belton Braves defeated the Temple Tigers 5 games to 1 to win the championship. Baseball Hall of Fame member Kid Nichols managed the 1914 Temple Tigers.

In its second season, with Hulen P. Robertson becoming the league president, the Middle Texas League began play on April 15, 1915. During the season, the Austin Reps/Representatives (2–5) moved to become the Taylor Producers on May 1, 1915, when floods forced the team to relocate from Austin. Taylor (15–23) then moved to Brenham on June 8, 1915, becoming the second team in Brenham, after the Brenham Brewers folded the day before. Both the Brenham Brewers and Schulenberg Giants disbanded on June 7, 1915. On June 19, 1915, the Middle Texas League permanently folded during the season. The final league standings featured the Austin Representatives/Taylor Producers/Brenham Kaisers (21–36), Bartlett Bearcats (29–26), Belton Braves (40–19), Brenham Brewers (12–31), Schulenburg Giants (23–18) and Temple Governors (32–27). The Belton Braves won both half seasons of the league standings and were league champions.

Baseball Hall of Fame member Ross Youngs played for Bartlett in 1915, hitting .264 in 59 games at age 18.

Middle Texas League teams

Standings and statistics

1914 Middle Texas League

1915 Middle Texas League

Baseball Hall of Fame alumni
Kid Nichols, Temple (1914) Inducted, 1949
Ross Youngs, Bartlett (1915) Inducted, 1972

References

Defunct minor baseball leagues in the United States
Baseball leagues in Texas
Defunct professional sports leagues in the United States
Sports leagues established in 1914
Sports leagues disestablished in 1915